The second cabinet of Constantin Sănătescu was the government of Romania from 4 November to 5 December 1944.

Ministers
The ministers of the cabinet were as follows:

President of the Council of Ministers:
Gen. Constantin Sănătescu (4 November - 5 December 1944)
Vice President of the Council of Ministers:
Petru Groza (4 November - 5 December 1944)
Minister of Internal Affairs:
Nicolae Penescu (4 November - 5 December 1944)
Minister of Foreign Affairs: 
Constantin Vișoianu (4 November - 5 December 1944)
Minister of Finance:
Mihail Romniceanu (4 November - 5 December 1944)
Minister of Justice:
Lucrețiu Pătrășcanu (4 November - 5 December 1944)
Minister of National Education:
Ștefan Voitec (4 November - 5 December 1944)
Minister of Religious Affairs and the Arts:
Ghiță Pop (4 November - 5 December 1944)
Minister of War:
(interim) Gen. Constantin Sănătescu (4 November - 5 December 1944)
Minister of War Production:
Constantin C. (Bebe) Brătianu (4 November - 5 December 1944)
Minister of Agriculture and Property
Ioan Hudiță (4 November - 5 December 1944)
Minister of National Economy:
Aurel Leucuția (4 November - 5 December 1944)
Minister of Communications:
Gheorghe Gheorghiu-Dej (4 November - 5 December 1944)
Minister of Public Works:
Virgil Solomon (4 November - 5 December 1944)
Minister of Cooperation:
Gheorghe Fotino (4 November - 5 December 1944)
Minister of Labour:
Lothar Rădăceanu (4 November - 5 December 1944)
Minister of Social Insurance:
Gheorghe Nicolau (4 November - 5 December 1944)
Minister of Health and Social Assistance:
Daniel Danielopolu (4 November - 5 December 1944)
Minister of Minorities:
Gheorghe Vlădescu-Răcoasa (4 November - 5 December 1944)

References

Cabinets of Romania
Cabinets established in 1944
Cabinets disestablished in 1944
1944 establishments in Romania
1944 disestablishments in Romania
Romania in World War II